Norway competed at the 1980 Summer Paralympics in Arnhem, Netherlands. 53 competitors from Norway won 36 medals including 15 gold, 13 silver and 8 bronze and finished 10th in the medal table.

Medalists

See also 
 Norway at the Paralympics
 Norway at the 1980 Summer Olympics

References 

Norway at the Paralympics
1980 in Norwegian sport
Nations at the 1980 Summer Paralympics